Warren N. Gaer (February 7, 1912 – January 13, 1997) was an American football player and coach. He served as the head football coach at Pepperdine College—now known as Pepperdine University—from 1946 to 1948 and Drake University from 1949 to 1958, compiling a career college football record of 64–49–2.

Pepperdine hired Gaer to form its football program in 1945. He served as head coach there from 1946 to 1948.  His teams tallied a mark of 22–6.  Gaer died on January 13, 1997, of cancer in his hometown of Atlantic, Iowa.

Head coaching record

References

External links
 

1912 births
1997 deaths
Drake Bulldogs football coaches
Drake Bulldogs football players
Pepperdine Waves football coaches
High school football coaches in Iowa
High school football coaches in Wisconsin
People from Atlantic, Iowa
People from Dickinson County, Iowa
People from Harlan, Iowa
Players of American football from Iowa
Deaths from cancer in Iowa